Mohanad Ali Kadhim Al-Shammari (born 20 June 2000), commonly known in Iraq as Mimi, is an Iraqi professional footballer who plays as a forward for Qatari club Al-Sailiya, on loan from Al-Duhail, and the Iraq national team. He is known for his positioning, shooting, heading, close ball control and dribbling.

Club career

Youth career
Mohanad became interested in football as a child and started playing for a local team in the Baghdad Al-Jadida district called Timsah Al-Amin. He enrolled at the Ammo Baba Football School at the age of six without a trial after coaches had been impressed with the striker. He then joined the Al-Quwa Al-Jawiya youth team, and he represented them in the Al-Zawraa Youth Championship; he was top scorer at two local tournaments, and was then called up by the Iraq FA to play for Saad Hashim's under-14 team, and with an outstanding performance, he grabbed the attention of the managers of Al-Shorta.

Al-Shorta

Early years
On 24 September 2013, the player signed a five-year contract with Al-Shorta. His competitive debut for the club was under Brazilian coach Lorival Santos in the 2013–14 Iraqi Premier League wearing the number 26 shirt, being substituted onto the field on 85 minutes in the Baghdad Derby against Al-Talaba on 26 March 2014, making him the youngest player to represent Al-Qitharah in the club's history at 13 years and 279 days old, and also the youngest player in the history of the Baghdad Derby matches. Al-Shorta topped the league standings with 43 points from 21 games, although the league was ended prematurely due to the war situation in the country.

In the 2014–15 season, Mohanad played in a four-team friendly competition called the Tournament for the Armed Forces, scoring a penalty in the semi-final shootout which Al-Shorta lost to Al-Quwa Al-Jawiya.
Mohanad was given the number 8 shirt for the 2015–16 season under coach Hakeem Shaker and he scored his first goal for Al-Shorta on 20 September 2015 against Al-Sinaa in the 2015–16 Iraqi Premier League with a header. He made two starts and nine substitute appearances in the group stage of the league, where Al-Shorta finished 4th in Group 2 to qualify to the Elite Stage. In the Elite Stage, the club finished in 7th position and Mohanad was used as a substitute for three of their six matches.

He spent the 2016–17 season on loan at Baghdad club Al-Kahrabaa, and finished as the top scorer for the club with 12 goals in 31 league matches, including scoring four goals in the same match against Al-Karkh on 4 January. The club finished 13th in the league.

2017–18 season
After the loan, he returned to Al-Shorta and renewed his contract in October 2017 for three years, taking the number 18 shirt. He scored his first two goals of the season against Naft Al-Junoob in a 2–1 victory in January 2018. He continued to score regularly throughout the season, forming a partnership with fellow striker Alaa Abdul-Zahra. He scored his first Baghdad Derby goal against Al-Zawraa on 20 January and scoring in another Baghdad Derby against Al-Talaba on 30 January. He finished his season with the team with 16 goals and assisted 8 times in 32 appearances in the league. The team finished in 4th position.

2018–19 season
He began his season with his team with a new coach, Nebojša Jovović, to exploit his speed as he also took on increasing defensive and creative duties. Mohanad scored his first goal and provided an assist in a 3–1 away win over Naft Al-Junoob on 21 October. He scored his second and third in a 3–0 win against Al-Sinaat Al-Kahrabaiya. On 7 November, Mohanad scored his fourth goal against former club Al-Kahrabaa. His fifth and sixth goal with his team came on 24 November including an impressive solo effort, and he scored another extraordinary goal against Al-Naft on 4 March 2019. Mohanad scored 20 goals and 10 assists in 31 games; he won league with the club.

His good form at club level saw him on the radar of many of European and Asian clubs. After his successful 2019 AFC Asian Cup campaign with the national team, there were official offers made from Italian clubs Juventus and Cagliari, Czech club Slavia Prague, Danish club Midtjylland, Belgian club Genk, Turkish club Galatasaray, Greek club AEK Athens, Emirati club Al-Ain and Qatari club Al-Duhail but Al-Shorta rejected the offers on 29 January 2019, meaning he would spend the rest of the season at Al-Shorta.

The end of the winter transfer window did not stop clubs from expressing their interest in Mohanad, with Al-Shorta's vice-president Abdul-Wahab Al-Taei stating that offers had also now been made by English club Manchester City, Turkish clubs Fenerbahçe, Hatayspor, Yeni Malatyaspor and İstanbul Başakşehir who sent a delegation in April, Russian club Akhmat Grozny, Qatari club Al-Wakrah and an unnamed Japanese club. After months of speculation about which club Mohanad would sign with, he completed a move to Qatari side Al-Duhail in July who agreed to pay an undisclosed fee.

Al-Duhail
 On 15 July 2019, he transferred to Qatari side Al-Duhail on a five-year contract, for a reported fee of $1.2 million. Mohanad made his debut for Al Duhail in the AFC Champions League against Al Sadd on 6 August, coming on as a second-half substitute. He scored his first goal with a solo effort after dribbling past Kara Mbodji and George Kwasi in the 89th minute on 3 October, coming on as a substitute in the 71st minute, in a 2–1 home win against Al-Sailiya.

Portimonense (loan)
On 30 January 2020, he was sent on loan to Primeira Liga side Portimonense for the rest of the 2019–20 season. Nineteen days later, Mohanad joined the team. He made a debut five days later, coming on as a late substitute for Bruno Tabata in a 0–1 away loss against Porto.

Al-Sailiya (loan)
On 29 August 2020, he was loaned to Al-Sailiya in Qatar. Mohanad scored on his debut in a 1–1 draw against Al-Rayyan on 3 September. Mohanad helped Al-Sailiya win the Qatari Stars Cup for the first major honour in the club's history, scoring a goal in the final. He also played the first three matches of Al-Sailiya's QFA Cup-winning campaign before suffering a head injury that kept him out of the semi-final and final. Mohanad played 27 games and scored 12 goals and had 3 assists in all competitions.

Aris Thessaloniki (loan) 
On 31 August 2021, Ali was loaned to Super League Greece side Aris Thessaloniki F.C. in the form of a one-year loan and with a purchase option from Al-Duhail. However, after only a few games, Ali damaged his cruciate ligaments, causing him to be sidelined for at least 6 months, to not only miss the majority of the season, but also miss the rest of the World Cup qualifiers with the Iraq national team.

International career

Youth
Mohanad made his debut for Iraq's Under-14s in 2013 at the age of just 13. He was the joint-top scorer at the 2013 Asian Youth Games with six goals in Nanjing in August 2013, where the Iraq U-14s beat Singapore, Kuwait and Thailand in the quarterfinals before they lost to Iran in the semis and the third and fourth match on penalties to North Korea. In the first ever edition of the AFC U-14 Championship in 2014 in Iran, Mohanad won the top scorer award with six goals and his team won the cup. In the 2015 WAFF U-16 Championship, Mohanad won the top scorer award with five goals and his team won the championship.

Senior
 He played his first match for the Iraq national team in a friendly against United Arab Emirates on 17 December 2017, however the match was not counted as an official international game, and so his official debut came against Bahrain in the 23rd Arabian Gulf Cup on 23 December 2017. He scored for Iraq in an unofficial friendly game against Iraqi Premier League club Naft Al-Junoob on 24 February 2018. His first and second international goals for Iraq were in a friendly match against Saudi Arabia on 28 February 2018.

He played against Argentina on 11 October 2018, coming on as a second-half substitute. He was nominated by the Asian Football Confederation (AFC) as one of the top young talents; he was described as the youngest player who has the potential to changing the shape of the game before 2019 AFC Asian Cup.

He scored his seventh goal against Vietnam on 8 January 2019, and his eighth against Yemen on 12 January 2019, followed by a goal against Jordan to help Iraq win the 2019 International Friendship Championship. Mohanad went on to score five more goals by the end of 2019. After his performance at the 2019 AFC Asian Cup and 2022 FIFA World Cup qualification, he was voted the 2019 West Asian Footballer of the Year and was also included in Chinese newspaper Titan Sports "Best Footballer in Asia 2019", which listed 26 of best footballers.

Style of play

Mohanad is talented player with good technique and close control, who is an adept header of the ball, and who has an ability to score impressive goals, in the air or with either foot, courtesy of his shooting ability and positional sense. He is physically strong, and is gifted with dribbling skills, anticipation, and confidence in going at opponents with numerical superiority. He is also known for his speed, and his ability beat defenders with sudden turns, as well as his vision, which gave him the ability to link-up with and provide assists for teammates.

Personal life
Mohanad is a Shammari Shiite born in Baghdad. The former international striker Ali Salah is one of his cousins. Mohanad played under the name of his brother Hassan Ali during the 2015–16 season with Al-Shorta and the 2016–17 season with Al-Kahrabaa. While at Al-Kahrabaa, he told the Football-IQ newspaper: "My official data and official documents in the records of the Asian Football Confederation are under the name Mohanad Ali, which is my real name. All it is is that an error in my personal data then led to me being called the name Hassan. I do not want to return to this issue which bothered me a lot, especially after my forms have been resolved by legal means". Football-IQ confirmed later in the year that an Iraqi court had ruled that his AFC documents under the name Mohanad Ali were correct, granting him the right to cancel his erroneous passport and obtain a new corrected one, thus allowing him to represent Iraq again. In late September 2020 he tested positive for COVID-19.

Career statistics

Club

International

Scores and results list Iraq's goal tally first, score column indicates score after each Ali goal.

Honours
Al-Shorta
Iraqi Premier League: 2018–19
Al-Duhail
Qatar Stars League: 2019–20
Al-Sailiya
Qatari Stars Cup: 2020–21
QFA Cup: 2021

Iraq Youth team
AFC U-14 Championship: 2014
WAFF U-16 Championship: 2015

Individual
2013 Asian Youth Games: Joint Top Scorer (6 goals)
2014 AFC U-14 Championship: Top Scorer (6 goals)
2015 WAFF U-16 Championship: Top Scorer (5 goals)
Soccer Iraq Goal of the Season: 2018–19
AFC Fans' Best Player in West Asia: 2019
Soccer Iraq Team of the Decade: 2010–2019
AFC Best Young Player of the Year nominee: 2020

References

External links

Interview with Mohanad Ali in March 2018

2000 births
Living people
Sportspeople from Baghdad
Association football forwards
Iraqi footballers
Iraqi expatriate footballers
Qatar Stars League players
Primeira Liga players
Super League Greece players
Al-Shorta SC players
Al-Duhail SC players
Portimonense S.C. players
Al-Sailiya SC players
Aris Thessaloniki F.C. players
Expatriate footballers in Qatar
Expatriate footballers in Portugal
Expatriate footballers in Greece
Iraqi expatriate sportspeople in Qatar
Iraqi expatriate sportspeople in Portugal
Iraq international footballers
2019 AFC Asian Cup players
Iraq youth international footballers